Thai Town is a neighborhood in Central Los Angeles, California.  It is the only officially recognized Thai Town in the United States. In 2008, it was designated a "Preserve America" neighborhood.

History
The Los Angeles City Council voted unanimously on October 27, 1999, to designate the neighborhood as "Thai Town," the first place in the United States with that name. The designation was proposed by Councilwoman Jackie Goldberg, who said the move would bring neighborhood pride, economic development and promotion of tourism to the area. At that time, the Department of Transportation was instructed to install signage to identify Thai Town.

It was significant to Goldberg that the staff of the Thai Community Development Center includes other Asians, Latinos and whites, all intent on improving the East Hollywood business community in general. "They're already calling Thai Town the 77th province," said Thai Chamber of Commerce President Niphun Rojanasopondist, referring to the 76 provinces that made up Thailand at the time.

The action followed a nine-year campaign by the Development Center. According to Ernest J. Vigoreaux, a half-Puerto Rican, half-Thai planner for the center, the idea was to bring tourism and business into a shabby section of town, helping not only Thais but everyone else there. The center won  a $15,000 Department of Public Works matching grant  to create a garden and to bring from Thailand four golden statues of kinnari (mythical creatures who are half angel, half bird) to mark Thai Town's borders.

In 2008, the Thai Community Development Center expanded its partnership with the four Asian Pacific Islander communities in Los Angeles to pursue a national designation by the White House of all five API towns as a Preserve America Neighborhood. The other communities are Chinatown, Little Tokyo, Historic Filipinotown and Koreatown. They formed the API Preserve America Neighborhood Coalition. First Lady Laura Bush presented the  "Preserve America" designation, signifying value as a cultural and historic asset. The designation made Thai Town eligible for up to $250,000 in Preserve America grants, along with $250,000 in other public and private matching funds.

Geography
Thai Town is a six-block neighborhood flanking Hollywood Boulevard between Normandie Avenue and Western Avenue, its entrances being marked by two statues of apsonsi (a mythical half human, half lion angel in Thai folklore).

Thai Town is bordered by the neighborhoods of Los Feliz to the north and east, central Hollywood to the west,  and Little Armenia to the south.

Neighborhood
The neighborhood has been the home to immigrant groups, including Armenians and Latinos, for a long time, and Thai Americans began settling there in the 1960s.   The area, which is home to many of the 80,000 Thais estimated to be living in Southern California, was said to be a working-class district that in 2007 was "one of the poorest sections of Los Angeles County, with many residents cramming into low-income apartments and working at minimum-wage jobs." Earlier, in 2000, it was described as "a rundown six-block stretch of Hollywood Boulevard crammed with Thai sweet shops, bookstores, restaurants, markets and newspaper offices."

In 2000 a Los Angeles Times writer said Thai Town was a place where

gourmands can stock up on bitter melon and round Thai eggplant. A Thai dessert shop offers preserved jackfruit, Pandan cookies and Kring Krang, crisply sweetened rice. The large Silom supermarket occupies the middle of a block near Hobart Boulevard, its exterior the rose-hued color of dusk with ornate trimming and a spirit house, draped with colorful garlands and a stone-faced Buddha image, guarding the entrance from destructive forces.

One result of the influx of Thai people into East Hollywood was that the neighborhood became a "point of entry" for other Thais, many of whom came to study at Southland universities.

Armenian immigrants own much of the property and live in the surrounding apartment buildings. One newspaper writer commented in 2000 that the neighborhood's ethnic politics are "complex and layered."

Population
Data for the area show that 27% of households live below the poverty line—a rate 12 percentage points higher than the county average. Fueling the persistent poverty has been the arrival of thousands of working-class Thai immigrants in the last two decades who have flooded sweatshops, restaurant kitchens and, most recently, massage parlors, said Chancee Martorell, executive director of the Thai Community Development Center, which has conducted several studies on the plight of Thai Town.

Public transport
The area is served by the Metro B Line subway at the Hollywood/Western station in addition to Metro Local bus lines 2, 180, 206, 207, & 217.

Holidays

On the first Sunday in April, Thai Town celebrates Songkran, the Thai New Year, by closing off Hollywood Boulevard within its boundaries, and setting up food stands and entertainment on the street along with a parade on the street from New Hampshire Avenue to Winona Boulevard.

See also

 List of Thai restaurants

References

Further reading

External links
Google maps link
 Colin Marshall, "A Los Angeles Primer: Thai Town," KCET50, July 16, 2013 (a survey of Thai Town tourist attractions)

Asian-American culture in Los Angeles
Ethnic enclaves in California
Neighborhoods in Los Angeles
Thai-American culture in California
East Hollywood, Los Angeles
Thai Towns